Abhinesh Maharshi is an Indian politician from the Ratangarh Assembly constituency in Rajasthan.He is a member of the 15th Assembly of Rajasthan as a Bharatiya Janata Party member.

Political career 
In 2008, he contested from Ratangarh assembly on a Congress ticket. He lost the election, securing 37,000 votes. In the 2014 Lok Sabha elections, Maharishi contested from Churu Loksbha seat on BSP ticket. He stood second and got three lakh votes. In the 2018 assembly elections, he defeated the independent Pusaram Godara by 11881 votes and became MLA for the first time.

References 

1962 births
People from Rajasthan
Bharatiya Janata Party politicians from Rajasthan
Rajasthan MLAs 2018–2023
Living people